Phoenix is the fourth studio album by Dutch dark wave band Xymox, released in 1991 by Wing Records/PolyGram. It was produced by Peter Walsh. Guitarist Michael Brook guested on the tracks "The Shore Down Under" and "Mark the Days".
 
The album charted in the United States at No. 163 on the Billboard 200.
The single Phoenix of My Heart peaked at No. 16 on Billboard'''s Hot Dance Club Play chart, as well as reaching No. 16 on the Billboard Modern Rock Tracks chart and No. 27 on the Billboard Hot Dance Music/Maxi-Singles Sales chart.

Reception
The album was perceived as slicker and more pop-minded than Xymox's previous albums. Gavin Report proclaimed the album "a faultless offering of this clan of musicians we call Xymox". Melody Maker said, "They haven't entirely abandoned seamless, panoramic sweeps that characterized their first couple of releases on 4AD, and they still have a firm emotional grip, but now they work in a less gloomy space. Phoenix'' is full of surprises".

Track listing
Based on:

Personnel
Xymox
Ronny Moorings – vocals, lyrics, guitar, keyboards
Anka Wolbert – vocals, lyrics, keyboards, bass
Pieter Nooten – vocals, lyrics, keyboards

Additional musicians
Michael Brook – guitar (3, 4)
Gavyn Wright – concert master (5)
Nick Ingman – arranger, string arrangements (5)
Manny Elias – drums, drum programming
Greg Walsh – keyboards, programming
Simon Clark – organ, Hammond organ (4)

Producers, engineers
Peter Walsh – producer, engineer, mixing ( 
Ronny Moorings – producer (2, 9)
Shaun Cymbalisty – engineer
Paul Apted – engineer

Graphic design
Chris Thompson – package design
Kevin Davies – photography

Notes
Recorded at Jacobs Studios, Surrey.
Mixed at Marcus Studios and Ridge Farm Studio.

References

Clan of Xymox albums
1991 albums
Albums produced by Peter Walsh